Statistics of Czechoslovak First League in the 1979–80 season.

Overview
It was contested by 16 teams, and FC Baník Ostrava won the championship. Werner Lička was the league's top scorer with 18 goals.

Stadia and locations

League standings

Results

Squad of the champions Baník Ostrava 
Coach: Evžen Hadamczik
 Milan Albrecht
 Augustín Antalík
 Václav Daněk
 František Kadlček
 Lubomír Knapp
 Verner Lička
 Zdeněk Lorenc
 Pavel Mačák 
 Jozef Marchevský
 Jan Matuštík
 Pavol Michalík
 Petr Němec
 Václav Pěcháček
 Libor Radimec
 Zdeněk Rygel
 Lubomír Šrámek
 Zdeněk Šreiner
 Dušan Šrubař
 Rostislav Vojáček

Top goalscorers

References

 Czechoslovakia - List of final tables (RSSSF)

Czechoslovak First League seasons
Czech
1979–80 in Czechoslovak football